The ninth season of Mira quién baila, also known as Mira quién baila Univision All Stars premiered on Univision on March 14, 2021. The TV series is the American spanish-language version of British version Strictly Come Dancing and American version Dancing with the Stars. This season features eight celebrities from Univision programs that are paired with eight professional ballroom dancers. The winner received a grand prize donation to the charity of their choice. Chiquinquirá Delgado returned as the show's host. Borja Voces joined as co-host, replacing Javier Poza. Dayanara Torres and Casper Smart returned as judges. Patricia Manterola joined as a judge, replacing Bianca Marroquín. Kiara Liz, contestant from the previous season, is a backstage reporter. The winner, Chef Yisus, received $30,000 for his chosen charity.

Celebrities 
The celebrities were announced on February 25, 2021.

Ratings

References

Dancing with the Stars
2021 American television seasons